Mera Yaar Miladay is 2016 romantic Pakistani television serial aired on ARY Digital. It stars Sajal Ali, Faysal Qureshi and Ahmed Ali Akbar in pivot roles. Produced by Fahad Mustafa and Ali Kazmi under Big Bang Entertainment, it was directed by Anjum Shahzad.

The show received mixed reviews from the viewers because it had to faced a tough competition at its time slot.

Cast 
 Sajal Aly as Mushk
 Faysal Qureshi as Dabbu
 Ahmed Ali Akbar as Fahad
 Firdous Jamal as Master Ji
 Faryal Mehmood as Mehru
 Saba Faisal as Fahad's Mother
 Saleem Mairaj as Aslam
 Ayesha Khan as Mushk's grandmother
 Zeba Shehnaz as Salma
 Jinaan Hussain as Isra
 Nida Mumtaz as Isra's mother
 Kanwar Nafees as Niaz
 Faiza Gillani as Muneeza
 Hina Rizvi as Bibbo Begum
 Danial Afzal Khan as Asad
 Beena Chaudhary as Mehru's mother
 Syed Fazal Hussain
 Asim Battal
 Shahid Naqvi

Soundtrack

The title song was performed by Rahat Fateh Ali Khan. The music was composed by Waqar Ali while lyrics were written by Sabir Zafar.

Production 
Earlier, the show was titled as Meri Jaan but the makers changed it to Mera Yaar Miladay.

See also 
 2016 in Pakistani television
 List of programs broadcast by ARY Digital

References

External links 
 Official website
 
 

2016 Pakistani television series debuts
2016 Pakistani television series endings
2020s romance television series
Urdu-language television shows
Pakistani drama television series
Pakistani television series